is a Japanese manga series by Hiroshi Tanaka. It was adapted into a live action film in 2012.

Cast
Yoshimi Tokui as Tetsu
Kento Hayashi as Shuhei
Sadao Abe
Tetsuji Tamayama
Nao Ōmori
Kazuki Kitamura
Arata Iura
Mitsuko Baisho
Kento Ayashi
Hirofumi Arai 
Jun Murakami

References

External links
Official film website 

1999 manga
Kodansha manga
Live-action films based on manga
Manga adapted into films
Seinen manga
Japanese drama films